Mingo is an unincorporated town in Tulsa County, Oklahoma, United States.

Geography 
It has a total area of 0.8 square miles, all land. Mingo is also 600 feet above sea level. Mingo is located at 46th St N and Mingo Road. It is located northeast of the Tulsa International Airport.

References

Geography of Tulsa County, Oklahoma